Frederick Pomeroy Palen (April 20, 1872 – December 2, 1933) was a prominent shipping executive.

Biography
Frederick Palen was born in Jenningsville, Pennsylvania on April 20, 1872, and educated in Monticello, New York. He went to Cornell University where he earned a degree in mechanical engineering. He took a job as draughtsman at the Newport News Shipbuilding and Dry Dock Company, and became chief engineer in 1906, and then general manager in 1912. In 1915 he was made a vice president. After admitting in 1929 to a Senate panel that he was responsible for employing William B. Shearer as an observer at the 1927 Geneva arms control conference, he resigned his position. In March 1930 he became president of the Primrose Publishing Corporation, which published The Marine Journal. He was also involved with the creation of the Merchant Marine Act of 1928.

Personal life
Palen married Lina Mayo in 1906, and had one son, Frederick. Palen died of pneumonia on December 2, 1933, at the Rockefeller Research Institute in New York.

References

1933 deaths
1870s births
Cornell University College of Engineering alumni
Deaths from pneumonia in New York City